Richard James may refer to:

 Richard T. James (1918–1974), American naval engineer, inventor of the Slinky
 Richard D. James (musician), real name of British electronic musician and composer, also known for his projects Aphex Twin and The Tuss
 Richard D. James (scientist) (born 1952), American mechanician and materials scientist at the University of Minnesota
 Richard James (Oklahoma politician) (1926–2013), American politician
 Richard James (aviator) (1911–1989), set the junior transcontinental air speed record in 1928
 Richard James (musician) (born 1975), Welsh musician
 Richard James (scholar) (1592–1638), British man of letters
 Richard James (Australian sprinter) (born 1956), Australian sprinter
 Richard James (pagan), founder of Odyssean Wicca
 Richard James (tailor), British tailor and menswear company
 Richard T. James (politician) (1910–1965), Lieutenant Governor of Indiana
 Richard James Simpson (born 1967), American musician, formerly Richard James
 Richard James (murderer) (1957–1975), Singaporean and one of the robbers cum murderers of the Gold Bars triple murders

See also
 James Richards (disambiguation)
 Rick James (1948–2004), American musician
 Dick James (1920–1986), British music publisher
 Dick James (American football) (1934–2000), American football halfback and defensive back